Wigtown Burghs, also known as Wigton Burghs,.  was a constituency of the House of Commons of the Parliament of Great Britain from 1708 to 1800 and of the House of Commons of the Parliament of the United Kingdom from 1801 to 1885. It was represented by one Member of Parliament (MP).

Creation
The British parliamentary constituency was created in 1708 following the Acts of Union, 1707 and replaced the former Parliament of Scotland burgh constituencies of  Wigtown, New Galloway,  Stranraer and Whithorn which had all been separately represented with one commissioner each.

The first election in Wigtown Burghs was in 1708. In 1707–08, members of the 1702–1707 Parliament of Scotland were co-opted to serve in the 1st Parliament of Great Britain. See Scottish representatives to the 1st Parliament of Great Britain, for further details.

Boundaries
The constituency was a district of burghs created to represent the Royal burghs of New Galloway, Stranraer, Whithorn and Wigtown.

In 1885 the district was abolished. New Galloway became part of the Kirkcudbrightshire constituency and the other three burghs were included in the Wigtownshire seat.

Political history
The constituency elected one Member of Parliament (MP) by the first past the post system until the seat was abolished for the 1885 general election.

The politics of this constituency in the mid-18th century were relatively simple. The Stewart family, led by the Earl of Galloway, normally controlled the burghs of Wigtown and Whithorn. The Dalrymple family, supporting the Earl of Stair, controlled Stranraer. The predominant interest in New Galloway was held by the Gordons of Kenmure.

Thus when Wigtown or Whithorn were the returning burgh, with a casting vote in the event of a tie, the candidate backed by the Stewarts won. At other elections the Dalrymple supported candidate had a chance. This state of affairs continued until 1784 when the Dalrymple interest gained control of the Whithorn Council.

In the 1754 election the Duke of Argyll attempted to support James Abercrombie for the Wigtown Burghs seat. The Earl of Galloway agreed with John Hamilton, a member of the Dalrymple family who was supposedly backing his relative Captain John Dalrymple of Stair, to support Hamilton in the Burghs seat in exchange for the Dalrymple interest backing Lord Galloway's brother (James Stewart) for the county seat. This coalition worked and John Hamilton was elected unopposed.

In 1761, with Wigtown as the returning burgh, the Earl of Galloway could name the MP. He hoped to return his Naval officer son, the Honourable Keith Stewart. As Stewart was away at sea in the West Indies, the Earl decided to support Archibald Montgomerie until his son returned. Montgomerie was also a candidate for Ayrshire in the same general election. After he was elected for both seats he decided to retain Ayrshire. Stewart was elected at a by-election but soon gave up the seat, as a result of negotiations about the Wigtownshire seat. The energetic intriguer John Hamilton was again elected for the Burghs seat in the third election there in less than a year.

In 1768, with Whithorn as the returning burgh, the Earl of Galloway could again decide the MP. For this election the Earl was trying to get a seat in England for his son, Lord Garlies, who was ineligible to represent a Scottish constituency as the eldest son of a Scottish peer. The Earl entered into an agreement with an English MP, George Augustus Selwyn, who controlled both seats in the borough of Ludgershall. Selwyn, who himself represented Gloucester, feared defeat there and wanted a safe alternative seat. In exchange for supporting Lord Garlies in Ludgershall, Selwyn was elected in the Wigtown Burghs. He was the first Englishman to be elected for a Scottish constituency after the Union. However, as Selwyn was also elected in Gloucester and preferred to represent that Borough, a new candidate was required in Scotland. The government was able to offer a Treasury nominee, Chauncy Townsend. After Townsend's death a junior branch of the Stewart family provided the new MP.

In 1774, with New Galloway as the returning burgh, an alliance of the Dalrymple and Gordon families hoped to triumph. National politics again influenced the situation, as Sir Lawrence Dundas suggested William Norton as a candidate. The Earl of Stair was trying to get his son a seat in England so he accepted the proposal of the governments electoral manager in Scotland. The Stewart interest supported the 7th Earl of Galloway's brother in law, Henry Watkin Dashwood. This was the first time two Englishmen contested a Parliamentary seat in Scotland. Norton was returned, but the seat was awarded to Dashwood after an election petition.

For the 1780 election the Earl of Stair, despite being a pro-American admirer of the Earl of Chatham, offered the nomination for the seat to Lord North in exchange for a diplomatic post for his son Lord Dalrymple. Lord North suggested William Adam.

In 1784 the change in Whithorn enabled the Dalrymple candidate (William Dalrymple) to defeat the Earl of Galloway's nominee (George Johnstone).

Members of Parliament

Elections
The constituency had only four voters (the commissioners elected by the Burgh Councils) in 1708–1832. The place of election rotated between the Burghs and the commissioner for the returning Burgh had a casting vote if there was a tie. It was possible for the Court of Session to suspend a Burgh's rights for a Parliament, as a punishment for corruption. This procedure could disrupt the rotation

From 1832 the franchise was extended and the votes from all the burghs were added together.

1708 (26 May) general election (election at Wigtown)
George Lockhart: Unopposed
Chose to sit for Edinburghshire
1708 (14 December) by-election (election at Wigtown)
William Cochrane: Unopposed
1710 general election
William Cochrane: Unopposed
1713 (17 September) general election
Alexander Maxwell: Unopposed
1715 (17 February) general election
Patrick Vanse: Unopposed
1722 (13 April) general election
William Dalrymple: Unopposed
1727 general election
William Dalrymple: Unopposed
Chose to sit for Wigtownshire
1728 (16 March) by-election
John Dalrymple: Unopposed
1734 (18 May) general election
John Stewart defeated John Dalrymple, vote totals unknown
1741 (28 May) general election
William Stewart: Unopposed
1747 (22 July) general election
John Stewart: Unopposed
1754 (9 May) general election (election at Stranraer)
John Hamilton: Unopposed
1761 (20 April) general election (election at Wigtown)
Archibald Montgomerie: 2 votes (Whithorn, Wigtown)
Hutchison Mure: 2 votes (New Galloway, Stranraer)
Montgomerie elected by Wigtown's casting vote
Chose to sit for Ayrshire
1762 (19 February) by-election (election at Wigtown)
Keith Stewart: Unopposed
Resigned
1762 (15 April) by-election (election at Wigtown)
John Hamilton: Unopposed
1768 (11 April) general election (election at Whithorn)
George Augustus Selwyn: Unopposed
Chose to sit for Gloucester
1768 (23 December) by-election (election at Whithorn)
Chauncy Townsend: Unopposed
Died
1770 (7 May) by-election (election at Whithorn)
William Stewart: Unopposed
1774 (31 October) general election (election at New Galloway)
William Norton: 2 votes (New Galloway, Stranraer)
Henry Watkin Dashwood: 2 votes (Whithorn, Wigtown)
Norton elected by New Galloway's casting vote
1775 (23 March) last election declared void
Henry Watkin Dashwood: Awarded the seat
1780 (2 October) general election (election at Stranraer)
William Adam: Unopposed
Appointed Treasurer of the Ordnance
1783 (9 May) by-election (election at Stranraer)
William Adam: Unopposed
1784 (26 April) general election (election at Wigtown)
William Dalrymple: 3 votes (New Gallowat, Stranraer, Whithorn)
George Johnstone: 1 vote (Wigtown)
1790 (12 July) general election (election at Whithorn)
Nisbet Balfour: 2 votes
Lord Daer: 2 votes
Balfour elected by Whithorn's casting vote
1796 (20 June) general election (election at New Galloway)
John Spalding: Unopposed
1802 general election (election at Stranraer)
John Spalding: 3 votes
Robert Vans Agnew: 1 vote
Resigned
1803 (29 July) by-election (election at Stranraer)
 William Stewart: Unopposed
Resigned
1805 (9 August) by-election (election at Stranraer)
James Graham: Unopposed
1806 (24 November) general election (election at Wigtown)
 Edward Richard Stewart: Unopposed
1807 general election (election at Whithorn)
 Edward Richard Stewart: Unopposed
Appointed a Commissioner for victualling the Navy
1809 (27 February) by-election (election at Whithorn)
Lyndon Evelyn (Tory): Unopposed
1812 (30 October) general election (election at New Galloway)
 James Henry Keith Stewart (Tory): Unopposed
1818 general election (election at Stranraer)
James Henry Keith Stewart (Tory): Unopposed
1820 general election (election at Wigtown)
James Henry Keith Stewart (Tory): Unopposed
Resigned
1821 (21 March) by-election (election at Wigtown)
John Osborn (Tory): Unopposed
Appointed a Commissioner for Auditing Public Accounts
1824 (4 March) by-election (election at Wigtown)
Nicholas Conyngham Tindal (Tory): Unopposed
1826 (3 July) general election (election at Whithorn)
John Henry Lowther (Tory): Unopposed
1830 general election (election at New Galloway)
John Henry Lowther (Tory): Unopposed
1831 (23 May) general election (election at Stranraer)
Edward Stewart (Whig): Unopposed
1832 general election
316 electors, 296 voted, turnout 93.67%
Edward Stewart (Liberal) 159 (53.72%)
John McTaggart (Liberal) 137 (46.29%)
majority 22 (7.43%)
1835 (19 January) general election
362 electors, 306 voted, turnout 84.53%
John McTaggart (Liberal) 224 (73.20%)
John Douglas (Liberal) 82 (26.80%)
majority 142 (46.41%)
1837 general election
380 electors, 267 voted, turnout 70.26%
John McTaggart (Liberal) 151 (56.55%)
Andrew Agnew (Liberal) 116 (43.45%)
majority 35 (13.11%)

Elections in the 1830s

Elections in the 1840s

Elections in the 1850s

Dunbar was appointed a Lord Commissioner of the Treasury, requiring a by-election.

Elections in the 1860s
Dunbar resigned after being appointed Commissioner for Auditing the Public Accounts, causing a by-election.

Young was appointed Solicitor General for Scotland, requiring a by-election.

Elections in the 1870s

On the initial count, Stewart had received 525 votes compared to Young's 517. However, on petition, his election was declared void and the above results were given after scrutiny. Nevertheless, by the time the petition was heard, Young had been appointed Senator of the College of Justice, and a by-election was necessitated.

Elections in the 1880s

McLaren was appointed Lord Advocate, requiring a by-election.

The by-election was declared void on petition, causing a second by-election.

References

Sources
The Parliaments of England by Henry Stooks Smith (1st edition published in three volumes 1844–50), 2nd edition edited (in one volume) by F.W.S. Craig (Political Reference Publications 1973)
History of Parliament: House of Commons 1754-1790, by Sir Lewis Namier and James Brooke (Sidgwick & Jackson 1964)
British Parliamentary Election Results 1832-1885, compiled and edited by F.W.S. Craig (The Macmillan Press 1977)

Historic parliamentary constituencies in Scotland (Westminster)
Constituencies of the Parliament of the United Kingdom established in 1708
Constituencies of the Parliament of the United Kingdom disestablished in 1885